Montevite (in Basque Mandaita and officially Madaita/Montevite) is a village in Álava, Basque Country, Spain. With just 53 inhabitants in 2015, it is the less populated village of Iruña de Oca municipality, where it is included.

Until 1976, next to Nanclares de la Oca and Ollávarre, it was within a municipality called Nanclares de la Oca.

Populated places in Álava
Towns in Spain